The John Sanderson House is a historic house at 564 Lexington Street in Waltham, Massachusetts.  Built in 1826, this -story wood-frame house is one a few Federal style houses in the city, and the only one with a brick end wall. It has well-preserved period features, including rear-wall chimneys, simple moulded window surrounds, and a centered entry with half-length sidelight windows. It is one of a cluster of houses in the immediate area with connection to the Sanderson family, who were early settlers of the area.

The house was listed on the National Register of Historic Places in 1989, where it is listed at 562 Lexington Street.

See also
Nathan Sanderson I House
Nathan Sanderson II House
Sanderson-Clark Farmhouse
National Register of Historic Places listings in Waltham, Massachusetts

References

Houses on the National Register of Historic Places in Waltham, Massachusetts
Federal architecture in Massachusetts
Houses completed in 1826
Houses in Waltham, Massachusetts
1826 establishments in Massachusetts